Bradyesthesia refers to the slowness of perception. The term originated from the word "aisthesis" which means sensation.

References

Sensory systems
Perception